Naranbedda is a village in Kegalle District, Sabaragamuwa Province of Sri Lanka.

References 

Populated places in Kegalle District